The 2013–14 Bucknell Bison men's basketball team represented Bucknell University during the 2013–14 NCAA Division I men's basketball season. The Bison, led by sixth year head coach Dave Paulsen, played their home games at Sojka Pavilion and were members of the Patriot League. They finished the season 16–14, 11–7 in Patriot League play to finish in fourth place. They lost in the quarterfinals of the Patriot League tournament to Army.

Roster

Schedule

|-
!colspan=9 style="background:#FF5E17; color:#0041C4;"| Regular season

|-
!colspan=9 style="background:#FF5E17; color:#0041C4;"| Patriot League tournament

References

Bucknell Bison men's basketball seasons
Bucknell
Bucknell Bison men's basketball team
Bucknell Bison men's basketball team